Weightlifting has been an event at the Islamic Solidarity Games since 2005 in Mecca.

Editions

Events

Men's events

2005–2017 *
Bantamweight -56 kg
Featherweight 56–62 kg
Lightweight 62–69 kg
Middleweight 69–77 kg
Light-heavyweight 77–85 kg
Middle-heavyweight 85–94 kg
Heavyweight 94–105 kg
Super heavyweight +105 kg

2021–present
55 kg
61 kg
67 kg
73 kg
81 kg
89 kg
96 kg
102 kg
109 kg
+109 kg

Women's events

2013 *
48 kg
53 kg
58 kg
63 kg
69 kg
75 kg
+75 kg

2017 *
48 kg
53 kg
58 kg
63 kg
69 kg
75 kg
90 kg
+90 kg

2021–present
45 kg
49 kg
55 kg
59 kg
64 kg
71 kg
76 kg
81 kg
87 kg
+87 kg

In 2013 and 2017 only total event awarded medals

Medal table

Multiple medalists

List of medalists

Records

External links
Asian Weightlifting Confederation

 
Islamic Solidarity Games